Ahsoka is an upcoming American limited series developed by Jon Favreau and Dave Filoni for Disney+. It is part of the Star Wars franchise and a spin-off from the series The Mandalorian, taking place in the same timeframe as that series and its other interconnected spin-offs after the events of Return of the Jedi (1983). Ahsoka features the character Ahsoka Tano from The Mandalorian and other Star Wars media.

Rosario Dawson stars as Ahsoka Tano, reprising her role from The Mandalorian. The character was created for the animated series Star Wars: The Clone Wars (voiced by Ashley Eckstein), and made her live-action debut in the second season of The Mandalorian. A spin-off series focused on the character was announced in December 2020, with Dawson reprising her role and Filoni set as writer after he co-created the character. Filming began in early May 2022, with multiple characters from the animated series Star Wars Rebels revealed to be appearing.

Ahsoka is scheduled to be released in mid-to-late 2023.

Episodes 
Dave Filoni is writing the series, while also directing multiple episodes, including the first, with Peter Ramsey also directing at least one episode.

Cast and characters 

 Rosario Dawson as Ahsoka Tano: A former Jedi Padawan, who was once Anakin Skywalker's apprentice. Savannah Steyn will play a younger Ahsoka.
 Natasha Liu Bordizzo as Sabine Wren:A young Mandalorian warrior and graffiti artist, Imperial Academy dropout and a former bounty hunter with expert knowledge of weapons and explosives. Bordizzo watched Rebels to prepare for her role.
 Eman Esfandi as Ezra Bridger: A former con artist and thief who was taken in by Kanan Jarrus to be trained as a Jedi, before fleeing the galaxy with Grand Admiral Thrawn.
 Hayden Christensen as Anakin Skywalker: Ahsoka's former Jedi mentor who had fallen to the dark side of the Force and became the Sith Lord Darth Vader.

Additionally, Ivanna Sakhno and Mary Elizabeth Winstead have been cast in undisclosed roles, while Ray Stevenson has been cast as a villainous admiral. The characters Hera Syndulla and Chopper are set to appear in the series.

Production

Development 
In December 2020, Lucasfilm announced several spin-off series from the Disney+ series The Mandalorian, including Ahsoka and The Book of Boba Fett; the spin-offs exist alongside The Mandalorian through interconnected stories, culminating in a "climactic story event", with Star Wars: Skeleton Crew also being set in the same timeframe as The Mandalorian and Ahsoka. Each series was being concurrently developed by Jon Favreau and Dave Filoni, with Filoni writing and serving as lead producer and showrunner on Ahsoka. The series focuses on the character Ahsoka Tano, who was co-created by Filoni for the animated series Star Wars: The Clone Wars and made her live-action debut in the second season of The Mandalorian. By April 2022, Peter Ramsey was hired to direct at least one episode of the series, with Filoni also directing multiple episodes of the series.

Writing 
The series begins after Ahsoka's appearances in The Mandalorian and The Book of Boba Fett, in which she is shown to be hunting for the character Grand Admiral Thrawn, and Filoni said the series would tell a serialized story rather than having separate adventures in each episode.

Casting 
With the series' announcement in December 2020, Rosario Dawson was confirmed to be reprising her role as Ahsoka Tano from The Mandalorian. By August 2021, Lucasfilm was reportedly looking to cast an actress to play the Star Wars Rebels character Sabine Wren in the series. In October, Hayden Christensen was set to reprise his role as Anakin Skywalker / Darth Vader, and Natasha Liu Bordizzo was cast as Wren by November. Later that month, Ivanna Sakhno joined the cast in an undisclosed role. In January 2022, Mary Elizabeth Winstead joined the cast in an undisclosed role, and the following month, Ray Stevenson joined the cast as an admiral. Stevenson previously voiced the character Gar Saxon in Rebels and The Clone Wars. Bordizzo was officially announced to be playing Wren in May, when other Star Wars Rebels characters were revealed to be appearing in the series including Hera Syndulla and Chopper. She had received news of her casting while filming Day Shift (2022). In September 2022, it was revealed that Eman Esfandi was cast as Ezra Bridger in the series. Mena Massoud had been rumored to be playing the character in the series, and stated after Esfandi's casting was revealed that he had auditioned for the role but the casting process had not gone further.

Filming 
Filming began on May 9, 2022, in Los Angeles, under the working title Stormcrow, with Eric Steelberg and Quyen Tran serving as cinematographers. The series used the StageCraft virtual production technology. Filming wrapped that October.

Marketing 
Filoni and Favreau promoted the series at Lucasfilm's Star Wars Celebration panel on May 26, 2022, with Dawson appearing in full costume via video message from the series' set. Dawson appeared in person at a panel on May 28 for The Mandalorian and The Book of Boba Fett, along with Filoni, Favreau, Bordizzo, and Chopper, and footage from the first three weeks of Ahsoka filming was shown.

Release 
Ahsoka is set to be released on Disney+ in mid-to-late 2023.

References

External links 
 
 
 
 Ahsoka on StarWars.com

2020s American science fiction television series
Action television series
Disney+ original programming
English-language television shows
Interquel television series
Productions using StageCraft
Space adventure television series
Star Wars television series
Television series created by Jon Favreau
Television series by Lucasfilm
The Mandalorian
Upcoming television series
2020s American television miniseries
Live action television shows based on films